Frank Brandon Nelson (May 6, 1911 – September 12, 1986) was an American comedic actor best known for playing put-upon foils on radio and television, and especially for his "EEE-Yeeeeeeeeesssss?" catchphrase.

He made numerous guest appearances on television shows, including The Jack Benny Program, I Love Lucy, The Real McCoys, The Addams Family, Alice, and Sanford and Son. He also provided voices for animated series such as The Flintstones, Mister Magoo, The Jetsons, Dinky Dog, and The Snorks.

Career

Radio 
Nelson began his entertainment career in radio, and later moved into television and movies. In 1926, at age 15, Nelson played the role of a 30-year-old man in a series broadcast from KOA in Denver, Colorado.

In 1929, Nelson moved to Hollywood, California, and worked in local dramatic broadcasts, usually playing the leading man. The first sponsored program in which he appeared that reached a national market was Flywheel, Shyster, and Flywheel, a situation comedy that aired from November 28, 1932, to May 22, 1933, starring Groucho and Chico Marx, and written primarily by Nat Perrin and Arthur Sheekman.

Work with Jack Benny
Nelson first found fame as the put-upon foil to Jack Benny on Benny's radio show during the 1940s and 1950s. Nelson began to appear on Benny's radio show in the late 1930s, doing various roles, but his eventual character began to take form around 1942. Nelson, whose character was never given a name, typically portrayed a sales clerk, dentist or customer service worker, and Benny's character would run into him seemingly out of nowhere. For example, needing airline tickets, Benny would call the ticket agent, "Oh Mister? Mister?" Nelson would then deliver his catchphrase, a bellowed "EEE-Yeeeeeeeeesssss?" The two men would banter, with Nelson gleefully delivering insulting one-liners such as, "Is that a hairpiece or did someone plant moss on your head?", and sarcastic responses like, after being asked at an airport ticket counter if he was the ticket clerk, "No, I'm a 747 with a moustache." Whatever his occupation in a particular episode, Nelson's character would usually be polite and patient with all of his customers except for Jack Benny. An especially noteworthy example occurred on the episode that aired Jan. 8, 1950. Early in the show, announcer Don Wilson mispronounced columnist Drew Pearson's name as "Drear Pooson," which got a big laugh. The writers made a quick change to the script, and later, when Benny approached Nelson and asked if he were the doorman, the latter replied, "Well, who do you think I am? Drear Pooson?" Benny, who collapsed in laughter (as did the audience), later cited it as one of the longest laughs ever on his show.

Nelson also appeared on Benny's television show beginning in 1950, doing the same "rude clerk" shtick. His other catchphrase, that would be worked into every routine, would have Benny asking something mundane, such as, "Do these shirts come in a medium?", and Frank would bellow, "Oo-oo-oo-ooh, DO they!" Nelson's sudden appearances usually led to spontaneous laughter or applause on the part of the audience.

Other work
Nelson performed on a number of Hollywood-based radio shows during this time, including Fibber McGee and Molly, and did radio work well into the late 1950s, on the few shows that remained on the air, including dramatic roles on such programs as Yours Truly, Johnny Dollar.

After Jack Benny, Nelson continued to work in sitcoms in similar roles, most notably in The Hank McCune Show and I Love Lucy. Nelson appeared as various characters during all six seasons of I Love Lucy (including the recurring role of game show host Freddie Fillmore) and appeared in two episodes as neighbor Ralph Ramsey, after the Ricardos moved to Westport, Connecticut in season six. He further appeared in The New Phil Silvers Show and The Addams Family in the 1960s, and Sanford and Son during the 1970s.

Later years
Toward the end of his life, Nelson enjoyed some newfound stardom among a younger generation of fans. From 1981 to 1986, he appeared in a string of popular commercials for McDonald's doing his trademark "EEE-Yeeeeeeeeesssss?" catchphrase, as part of the fast-food chain's highly successful "You Deserve a Break Today" vacation sweepstakes promotional campaign, in which he played an over-the-top passport agent. He also did a cameo appearance on the December 5, 1981, episode of Saturday Night Live as a newsstand vendor, when Tim Curry was the guest host. 

In addition to his onscreen work, Nelson was an in-demand voiceover artist for animated cartoons.  In 1954, he narrated Walter Lantz's cartoon short Dig That Dog.  In television cartoons, he made several appearances on The Flintstones, Calvin and the Colonel, The Jetsons, and (as Governor Wetworth) on The Snorks, among other programs. Between 1978 and 1979, he provided the voice of Uncle Dudley on Dinky Dog. He also served as national president of AFTRA (a performers union) between 1954 and 1957.

Nelson occasionally appeared in films in variations of his oily clerk characterization. One of his roles is in Down Memory Lane (1949), in which he plays the manager of a TV station. He also appears in So You Want to Know Your Relatives, a Joe McDoakes spoof of This Is Your Life; Nelson plays the master of ceremonies, ushering guests onstage.

Death 
Nelson was diagnosed with cancer during the late summer of 1985. After a year-long battle with the disease, he died in Hollywood on September 12, 1986, at the age of 75. He was entombed in Forest Lawn Memorial Park Cemetery in Glendale. Nelson shares a columbarium niche with his longtime friend and fellow radio actor Hanley Stafford, both men having been married to radio actress and singer Veola Vonn.

Legacy
His distinctive appearance and manner of saying "yes?" has been parodied frequently in film, radio and television, most notably with the character on The Simpsons called the "Frank Nelson Type" (aka "Yes Guy"). Nelson's appearance and mannerisms were also parodied multiple times in the Disney Afternoon series TaleSpin, with Nelson represented by a large hippopotamus in a suit. The Daily Show often featured a Nelson impression by host Jon Stewart after a setup clip, often "Yeeesss?" or "Go onnnnnnn ..." followed by another clip which serves as the punchline. He was also parodied in the Merrie Melodies cartoon "Canary Row".

Partial filmography
 Fugitive in the Sky (1936) as Radio Announcer (uncredited)
 Gang Bullets (1938) Radio Announcer (uncredited)
 Down Memory Lane (1950 film) (1950) Mr. Jefferds
 The Milkman (1950) Mr. Green
 Bonzo Goes to College (1952) Dick
 It Should Happen To You (1954) Harold At Macy's (uncredited)
 It's Always Fair Weather (1955) It's Always Fair Weather) (uncredited)
 The Malibu Bikini Shop (1986) Richard J. Remington (final movie role, film released after his death)

References

Further reading

External links 
 
 A fond remembrance of Frank Nelson by colleague Mark Evanier
 Frank Nelson memorial site, with sound clips and memorabilia collected by Frank Nelson
 

1911 births
1986 deaths
American male television actors
American male comedians
American male radio actors
American male voice actors
American radio personalities
Deaths from cancer in California
Male actors from Colorado Springs, Colorado
Burials at Forest Lawn Memorial Park (Glendale)
20th-century American male actors
20th-century American comedians
Presidents of the American Federation of Television and Radio Artists